Addams Family Values may refer to:

 Addams Family Values, the 1993 motion picture
 Addams Family Values: The Original Orchestral Score, featuring Marc Shaiman and Artie Kane
 Addams Family Values: Music from the Motion Picture, an urban music soundtrack
 Addams Family Values (video game)

See also 
 The Addams Family